Kapelle is the name of several locations in the Netherlands and Belgium:

In Belgium:
 Kapelle-op-den-Bos, a town in Flemish Brabant
 Kapellen, Belgium, a town in the Belgian province of Antwerp
 Westkapelle, Belgium, a village in West Flanders

In the Netherlands
 Kapelle, a town and municipality in Zeeland
 Kapelle, Schouwen-Duiveland, a hamlet in Zeeland
 Looperskapelle, formerly also known as "Kapelle", in Zeeland
 Oostkapelle, another village in Zeeland
 Westkapelle, Netherlands, another village in Zeeland

It may also be a former spelling of several places now spelled Capelle (disambiguation) or Kappel (disambiguation).

See also
 Capelle (disambiguation)
 Cappel (disambiguation)
 Kappel (disambiguation)
 Kapellen (disambiguation)